Gravedona ed Uniti is a comune (municipality) in the Province of Como in the Italian region Lombardy, located about  north of Milan and about  northeast of Como.

The municipality of Gravedona ed Uniti contains the frazioni (subdivisions, mainly villages and hamlets) of Negrana, San Carlo, Segna, Trevisa, Traversa and, following an act of fusion passed by Lombardy Region, the annexed former municipalities of Consiglio di Rumo and Germasino, included on May 16, 2011.

The town of Gravedona has a small harbour and overlooks Lake Como and the eastern shoreline.

Gravedona ed Uniti borders the following municipalities: Colico, Domaso, Dongo, Dosso del Liro, Garzeno, San Nazzaro Val Cavargna, Peglio, Stazzona and, in Switzerland, Roveredo, Sant'Antonio and San Vittore.

Demographic evolution

References

Cities and towns in Lombardy